Zineddine Mekkaoui (born January 10, 1987, in Algiers) is an Algerian footballer.

Club career
In June 2009, Mekkaoui was loaned out by USM Alger to NA Hussein Dey for the 2009–10 season.

References

External links
 
 

1987 births
Algerian footballers
Algerian Ligue Professionnelle 1 players
Algeria youth international footballers
Algeria under-23 international footballers
Living people
NA Hussein Dey players
Footballers from Algiers
USM Alger players
USM Annaba players
JS Kabylie players
CS Constantine players
RC Relizane players
MC Oran players
Association football defenders
21st-century Algerian people